George Mitchell (February 21, 1905 – January 18, 1972) was an American actor who performed from 1935 through 1971 in film, television, and on Broadway.

Early life
Mitchell was born February 21, 1905, in Larchmont in Westchester County in New York.  He decided to become an actor after marrying actress Katherine Squire.

Roles of note

Mitchell became a bit typecast in Hollywood, usually playing loathsome characters who operated outside of the law. On television, Mitchell's credits include acting in two episodes of Alfred Hitchcock Presents called "Wally the Beard" (original air date March 1, 1965) with co-stars Larry Blyden and Kathie Brown, in which he played a knowledgeable and cranky seller of boats, and "Forty Detectives Later" (airing April 24, 1960), in which he portrayed the client of a private detective (James Franciscus) whom he hires to track the supposed murderer (Jack Weston) of his wife.  On Broadway, 1969–70, he portrayed Chief Joseph in the play Indians, the source of Robert Altman's film Buffalo Bill and the Indians, or Sitting Bull's History Lesson.

George Mitchell acted in several films and television episodes with his wife, Katherine Squire, the two of them often playing a husband-and-wife couple intrinsic to the story.  One example was the two of them as an elderly couple in the Jack Nicholson film "Ride in the Whirlwind" — they first appear as a refuge for the two men on the run, but who then become instrumental to the fugitives' destruction.  Other examples occurred in their roles in episodes of The Alfred Hitchcock Hour.

George Mitchell's major acting credits include the film The Andromeda Strain (1971), directed by Robert Wise, co-starring Arthur Hill, and based on the novel of the same name by Michael Crichton. He played the comic relief as cranky old town drunk who, along with an infant, were among the only survivors of exposure to the deadly Andromeda Strain.

Broadway career

 The Merry Widow, playing Cascada, July 15, 1942 – August 16, 1942
 The New Moon, playing Jacques, August 18, 1942 – September 6, 1942
 The Patriots, playing Ned, January 29, 1943 – June 26, 1943
 Blossom Time, playing Von Schwind, September 4, 1943 – October 9, 1943
 The New Moon, playing Captain Paul Duval, May 17, 1944 – ?
 Goodbye, My Fancy, playing Dr. Pitt, November 17, 1948 – December 24, 1949
 The Day After Tomorrow, playing Dr. Shaw, October 26, 1950 – November 11, 1950
 Desire Under the Elms, playing Peter Cabot, January 16, 1952 – February 23, 1952
 The Crucible, playing John Willard, January 22, 1953 – July 11, 1953
 Indians, playing Chief Joseph, October 13, 1969 – January 3, 1970

Film career

 Once in a Blue Moon (1935) .... Kolla
 Virginia (1941) .... Guest (uncredited)
 Captain Eddie (1945) .... Lt. Johnny De Angelis
 The Phenix City Story (1955) .... Hugh Britton
 3:10 to Yuma (1957) .... Bartender
 The Wild and the Innocent (1959) .... Uncle Lije Hawks
 Third of a Man (1962)
 Birdman of Alcatraz (1962) .... Father Matthieu (uncredited)
 Kid Galahad (1962) .... Harry Sperling
 Twilight of Honor (1963) .... District Attorney Paul Farish
 The Unsinkable Molly Brown (1964) .... Monsignor Ryan
 Nevada Smith (1966) .... Paymaster
 Ride in the Whirlwind (1966) .... Evan
 The Flim-Flam Man (1967) .... Tetter
 The Learning Tree (1969) .... Jake Kiner
 The Andromeda Strain (1971) .... Jackson
 Two-Lane Blacktop (1971) .... Truck Driver at Accident

Television career
Mitchell had roles on television in shows ranging from the 1950s dramas of the Golden Age of Television (such as Goodyear Television Playhouse, Westinghouse Studio One, and The United States Steel Hour) to the westerns of the 1960s (including Tales of Wells Fargo, Zane Grey Theater, Death Valley Days, Gunsmoke, Laramie, Bonanza, The Virginian, and Have Gun, Will Travel).

He was in the 1956 NBC adventure/musical The Adventures of Marco Polo, and several episodes of both The Twilight Zone and One Step Beyond. Another speciality was police/crime shows:  Perry Mason, Peter Gunn, The Detectives Starring Robert Taylor, The Untouchables, Stoney Burke, Sam Benedict, and Naked City.

He even tried comedy (Hazel, The Ghost & Mrs. Muir, Bewitched), medical (Ben Casey), and science-fiction-adventure shows (Time Tunnel, Land of the Giants, and Voyage to the Bottom of the Sea).  He was also on Daktari, Lassie, Run for Your Life, and the 1961 NBC series, The Americans, a dramatization of family divisions in the American Civil War.

On the 1960s gothic soap opera Dark Shadows, he originated the role of Matthew Morgan (later assumed by actor Thayer David).

Personal life
In 1940, he married Katherine Squire, with whom he often worked on stage, in film, and on television.  He died on January 18, 1972, in Washington, D.C. Mrs. Mitchell died in 1995.

References

External links

1905 births
1972 deaths
20th-century American male actors
American male film actors
American male stage actors
American male television actors
Male actors from New York City
People from Larchmont, New York